Oberthal is a municipality in the district of Sankt Wendel, in Saarland, Germany. It is situated approximately 7 km northwest of Sankt Wendel, and 35 km north of Saarbrücken.

References

Sankt Wendel (district)